The ThunderBowl  is owned by Colorado State University–Pueblo. Its current tenants are the Colorado State University–Pueblo ThunderWolves football team.

Notes

CSU Pueblo ThunderWolves football
College football venues
American football venues in Colorado
2008 establishments in Colorado
Sports venues completed in 2008
Buildings and structures in Pueblo, Colorado